Stryj may refer to:
Stryj, Lublin Voivodeship, east Poland
Stryi, Ukraine (Stryj in Polish)
Stryi Raion, Ukraine
Stryi (air base), Ukraine
Stryi River, in Ukraine
 Zbigniew Stryj (born 1968), Polish actor